In Greek mythology, the Nereids or Nereides (also Νημερτές) are sea nymphs (female spirits of sea waters), the 50 daughters of the 'Old Man of the Sea' Nereus and the Oceanid Doris, sisters to their brother Nerites. They often accompany Poseidon, the god of the sea, and can be friendly and helpful to sailors (such as the Argonauts in their search for the Golden Fleece).

Etymology

The synonyms Νηρηΐδες and Νημερτές are etymologically unrelated. Νηρηΐδες is a patronymic, describing them as the daughters of Nereus. Νημερτές means literally 'not-mistaking', and there is an adjective of the same form meaning 'clear', 'unmistakable', or 'true'.

Mythology

The Nereids symbolized everything that is beautiful and kind about the sea. Their melodious voices sang as they danced around their father. They are represented as beautiful women, crowned with branches of red coral and dressed in white silk robes trimmed with gold.

These nymphs are particularly associated with the Aegean Sea, where they dwelt with their father Nereus in the depths within a golden palace. The most notable of them are Thetis, wife of Peleus and mother of Achilles; Amphitrite, wife of Poseidon and mother of Triton; Galatea, the vain love interest of the Cyclops Polyphemus, and lastly, Psamathe who became the mother of Phocus by King Aeacus of Aegina, and Theoclymenus and Theonoe by Proteus, a sea-god or king of Egypt.

In Homer's Iliad XVIII, when Thetis cries out in sympathy for the grief of Achilles for the slain Patroclus, her sisters appear. Four of her siblings, Cymodoce, Thalia, Nesaea and Spio were also among the nymphs in the train of Cyrene. Later on, these four together with their other sisters Thetis, Melite and Panopea, were able to help the hero Aeneas and his crew during a storm.

In one account, Cassiopeia boasted that her daughter Andromeda was more beautiful than the Nereides, who were enraged by the claim. Poseidon, in sympathy for them, sent a flood and a sea monster to the land of the Ethiopians, demanding as well the sacrifice of the princess. These sea goddesses also were said to reveal to men the mysteries of Dionysus and Persephone.

Names
 
This list is correlated from four sources: Homer's Iliad, Hesiod's Theogony, the Bibliotheca of Pseudo-Apollodorus and the Fabulae of Hyginus. Because of this, the total number of names goes beyond fifty.

Iconography 

In ancient art the Nereides appear in the retinue of Poseidon, Amphitrite, Thetis and other sea-divinities. On black-figure Greek vases they appear fully clothed, such as on a Corinthian hydra (sixth century BCE; Paris) where they stand near the bier of Achilles. Later vase-paintings depict them nude or partially nude, mounted on dolphins, sea-horses or other marine creatures, and often grouped together with Tritons. They appear as such on Roman frescoes and sarcophagi. An Etruscan bronze cista from Palestrina depicts winged Nereides.

Famous is the Nereid Monument, a marble tomb from Xanthos (Lycia, Asia Minor), partially in the collection of the British Museum. At the top is a small temple surrounded by pillars between which Nereides stood. They were depicted in motion and with billowing, transparent clothes. The style is Attic-Ionian and dates to ca. 400 BCE.

In the Renaissance and baroque periods the Nereid was frequently used to decorate fountains and garden monuments.

Worship 
Nereides were worshiped in several parts of Greece, but more especially in sea-port towns, such as Cardamyle, and on the Isthmus of Corinth. The epithets given them by the poets refer partly to their beauty and partly to their place of abode.

Modern use
In modern Greek folklore, the term "nereid" (neráida) has come to be used for all nymphs, fairies, or mermaids, not merely nymphs of the sea.

Nereid, a moon of the planet Neptune, is named after the Nereids, as is Nereid Lake in Antarctica.

See also
 Neraida (type of supernatural wife)

Notes

References 

 Aken, Dr. A.R.A. van. (1961). Elseviers Mythologische Encyclopedie. Amsterdam: Elsevier.
 Apollodorus, The Library with an English Translation by Sir James George Frazer, F.B.A., F.R.S. in 2 Volumes, Cambridge, MA, Harvard University Press; London, William Heinemann Ltd. 1921. . Online version at the Perseus Digital Library. Greek text available from the same website.
Gaius Julius Hyginus, Astronomica from The Myths of Hyginus translated and edited by Mary Grant. University of Kansas Publications in Humanistic Studies. Online version at the Topos Text Project.
Gaius Julius Hyginus, Fabulae from The Myths of Hyginus translated and edited by Mary Grant. University of Kansas Publications in Humanistic Studies. Online version at the Topos Text Project.
 Gaius Valerius Flaccus, Argonautica translated by Mozley, J H. Loeb Classical Library Volume 286. Cambridge, MA, Harvard University Press; London, William Heinemann Ltd. 1928. Online version at theio.com.
 Gaius Valerius Flaccus, Argonauticon. Otto Kramer. Leipzig. Teubner. 1913. Latin text available at the Perseus Digital Library.
 Hesiod, Theogony from The Homeric Hymns and Homerica with an English Translation by Hugh G. Evelyn-White, Cambridge, MA.,Harvard University Press; London, William Heinemann Ltd. 1914. Online version at the Perseus Digital Library. Greek text available from the same website.
 Homer, The Iliad with an English Translation by A.T. Murray, Ph.D. in two volumes. Cambridge, MA., Harvard University Press; London, William Heinemann, Ltd. 1924. . Online version at the Perseus Digital Library.
 Homer, Homeri Opera in five volumes. Oxford, Oxford University Press. 1920. . Greek text available at the Perseus Digital Library.
 The Hymns of Orpheus. Translated by Taylor, Thomas (1792). University of Pennsylvania Press, 1999. Online version at the theoi.com
Kerényi, Carl, The Gods of the Greeks, Thames and Hudson, London, 1951.
Lucian of Samosata, Dialogues of the Sea Gods translated by Fowler, H W and F G. Oxford: The Clarendon Press. 1905. Online version at theoi.com
 Luciani Samosatensis, Opera. Vol I. Karl Jacobitz. in aedibus B. G. Teubneri. Leipzig. 1896. Greek text available at the Perseus Digital Library.
Pausanias, Description of Greece with an English Translation by W.H.S. Jones, Litt.D., and H.A. Ormerod, M.A., in 4 Volumes. Cambridge, MA, Harvard University Press; London, William Heinemann Ltd. 1918. . Online version at the Perseus Digital Library
Pausanias, Graeciae Descriptio. 3 vols. Leipzig, Teubner. 1903.  Greek text available at the Perseus Digital Library.
Publius Ovidius Naso, Metamorphoses translated by Brookes More (1859-1942). Boston, Cornhill Publishing Co. 1922. Online version at the Perseus Digital Library.
Publius Ovidius Naso, Metamorphoses. Hugo Magnus. Gotha (Germany). Friedr. Andr. Perthes. 1892. Latin text available at the Perseus Digital Library.
Publius Vergilius Maro, Aeneid. Theodore C. Williams. trans. Boston. Houghton Mifflin Co. 1910. Online version at the Perseus Digital Library.
Publius Vergilius Maro, Bucolics, Aeneid, and Georgics. J. B. Greenough. Boston. Ginn & Co. 1900. Latin text available at the Perseus Digital Library.
Publius Vergilius Maro, Bucolics, Aeneid, and Georgics of Vergil. J. B. Greenough. Boston. Ginn & Co. 1900. Online version at the Perseus Digital Library.

External links

Nereids in classical literature and art
Nereid and Triton Mosaic from Ephesus Terrace Home -2
3D stereoview of Nereid and Triton relief from Temple of Apollo in Didim
Warburg Institute Iconographic Database (ca 600 images of Nereids and other sea deities)

Greek sea goddesses
 
Water spirits